Tonio Biondini (1 January 1945 – 23 June 1983) was an Italian cross-country skier. He competed at the 1972 Winter Olympics and the 1976 Winter Olympics.

References

External links
 

1945 births
1983 deaths
Italian male cross-country skiers
Olympic cross-country skiers of Italy
Cross-country skiers at the 1972 Winter Olympics
Cross-country skiers at the 1976 Winter Olympics
Sportspeople from the Province of Modena